The Accidental Prime Minister is a 2019 Indian Hindi-language film directed by Vijay Ratnakar Gutte and written by Mayank Tewari, based on the 2014 memoir of the same name by Sanjaya Baru. It was produced by the Bohra Bros under Rudra Production (UK), in association with Jayantilal Gada under the banner of Pen India Limited. It stars Anupam Kher as Dr. Manmohan Singh, the 13th Prime Minister of India from 2004 to 2014 under the United Progressive Alliance.

The film was released on 11 January 2019.

Plot
Based on the memoir by Indian policy analyst Sanjaya Baru, The Accidental Prime Minister explores the tenure of Manmohan Singh as the Prime Minister of India, and the interference of the Congress Party in contradicting his decisions during his first tenure. The movie details how Singh fell victim to the Congress Party's dynastic approach. The movie highlights how Manmohan Singh was constantly ignored by the Congress to maintain turf for Rahul Gandhi, the son of Sonia Gandhi

Cast 
Anupam Kher as Manmohan Singh
Akshaye Khanna as Sanjaya Baru
Suzanne Bernert as Sonia Gandhi
Arjun Mathur as Rahul Gandhi
Aahana Kumra as Priyanka Gandhi
Anasuya Mazumder as Mamata Banerjee
Vimal Verma as Lalu Prasad Yadav
Avtar Sahni as L. K. Advani
Anil Rastogi as Shivraj Patil
Ajit Satbhai as P. V. Narasimha Rao
Chitragupta Sinha as P. V. Ranga Rao
Vipin Sharma as Ahmed Patel
Divya Seth as Gursharan Kaur
Shiv Kumar Subramaniam as P. Chidambaram
Munish Bhardwaj as Kapil Sibal
Ram Avtar as Atal Bihari Vajpayee
Sunil Kothari as A. P. J. Abdul Kalam
Atul Kumar as Jyotindra Nath Dixit
Anish Kuruvilla as T. K. A. Nair
Prakash Belawadi as M. K. Narayanan
Vinod Khanna as Subbu
Madan Joshi as Brajesh Mishra
Pradeep Chakravarti as Pranab Mukherjee
Yogesh Tripathy as Natwar Singh
Bobby Parvez as Pulok Chatterji
Anil Zankar as Sitaram Yechury
Hansal Mehta as Naveen Patnaik
Deepak Gheewala as N. Ram
Naval Shukla as Yashwant Sinha
Deepak Dadwal as Jaswant Singh 
Ashok Sagar Bhagat as Arjun Singh
Ramesh Bhatkar as Prithviraj Chavan
Subhash Tyagi as Mulayam Singh Yadav
Manoj Tiger as Amar Singh
Adarsh Gautam as Yousaf Raza Gilani
Chembur Hari as A. K. Antony
Kishor Jaykar as George Fernandes
Aazam Khan as Ghulam Nabi Azad
Vijay Singh as Bhairon Singh Shekhawat
Askari Naqvi as Vir Sanghvi
Pradeep Kuckreja as Prakash Karat
Gull Jolly as Daman Singh
Archana Sharma as Chiki Sarkar
Sandeep Dhabale as Arnab Goswami
Poorti Arya as  One of the Reporters
Apurva Nemlekar as One of the Reporters
Narendra Modi as Cameo Appearance
Dr. Manmohan Singh as Cameo Appearance

Production 
Principal photography begun on 31 March 2018 in London. The London-based shooting schedule concluded on 21 April 2018. In India, most of the shoot occurred in New Delhi which later wrapped up on 4 July 2018.

Marketing and release 
The first look of the film was released on 6 June 2017 through Anupam Kher's official Twitter handle. New poster of the film giving date of release of the film. With launch of new poster the release date has been advanced to 11 January 2019.

A new look poster of the film has been released by TAP official on 3 January 2019.

The Hindi version film was released on 11 January 2019 on 1300 screens in India and 140 in overseas. The Tamil and Telugu dubbed versions released on 18 January 2019.

Reception
The Economic Times has given the film 3.5 stars out of 5, describing the film as "well-crafted" and Kher's portrayal of Manmohan Singh "a convincing act".

Utkarsh Mishra reviewing the film for Rediff.com, gives the film 3.5 stars out of 5, observes that the movie if carefully watched comes out as "well made", he criticises Kher for over dramatising Singh's walking style.

Saibal Chatterjee of NDTV gave the film 1.5 stars out of 5, noting that “The Accidental Prime Minister is neither hugely entertaining nor engagingly dramatic.”
Shubra Gupta of The Indian Express sums up the retort: "The Accidental Prime Minister is an out-an-out propaganda film, created for the specific purpose of making the former prime minister look like a weak, spineless man, a puppet whose strings were controlled by The Family".

The Times of India's Ronak Kotecha gave the film 3.5 stars out of 5 stating "Bollywood has produced several political dramas that are intense, complex and dark, The Accidental Prime Minister has all of that in measured tones." Koimoi's Umesh Punwani gave the film 2 stars out of 5 stating "A Silent Disappointment. Akshaye Khanna is outstanding. I could just watch this movie again to fast-forward and go through just his scenes."

Historical accuracy 
Ajaz Ashraf writing for the Firstpost felt that the trailer of the film seemed to suggest that Sanjaya Baru was the media adviser and chief spokesperson of Manmohan Singh during 2011 Indian anti-corruption movement. However, Baru was only in this position during May 2004 to August 2008. The book ends in May 2009 when UPA returned to power following 2009 Indian general election. Baru had written 14-page epilogue with speculations and questions which is used as a pivotal subject in the film.

Soundtrack 

The single track is composed by Sandhu Tiwari while lyrics are written by Baba Ngarjun.

Controversy
In 2017, former Censor Board chief Pahlaj Nihalani had said that the filmmakers will need to obtain a No-objection certificates from former Prime Minister Manmohan Singh and Indian National Congress President Rahul Gandhi for the film.

Ruling Bharatiya Janata Party promoted the trailer through their official Twitter account. Reacting to this, a Congress spokesperson alleged that the film was "political propaganda". Upon the release of the trailer, the Congress party's Maharashtra youth wing in a letter to the producers of the films raised objections to the “incorrect presentation of the facts” and demanded a special screening of the film. They later withdrew the letter, intending to not publicize the film.

On 2 January 2019, lead actor Anupam Kher tweeted that people were reporting that the film's trailer was unseen as a top search result while being directly searched for on YouTube.  The newspaper India Today conducted their own search, and confirmed Kher's allegations, noting that only after the following day was the trailer returned to its position as a top search result. This led to speculation that the trailer had initially been removed intentionally as part of an anti-propaganda campaign. On 8 January 2019, a local court in Bihar ordered FIR against Anupam Kher and thirteen other associated with the film for defaming political leaders.

See also
 PM Narendra Modi
 Pradhanmantri

References

External links 
 
 
 

2010s Hindi-language films
2019 films
Cultural depictions of prime ministers of India
Films based on Indian novels
Indian biographical films
Indian films based on actual events
Indian political films
Cultural depictions of Manmohan Singh
Cultural depictions of Narendra Modi
2010s biographical films
2010s political films
Desi films
British Indian films
Films set in the British Raj
P. V. Narasimha Rao
A. P. J. Abdul Kalam
Rahul Gandhi
Mamata Banerjee
Jaswant Singh
Yousaf Raza Gillani
Sarkar family
Cultural depictions of Indian men
Cultural depictions of Indian women
Cultural depictions of politicians
Nehru–Gandhi family
Atal Bihari Vajpayee